The 1st Infantry Regiment (1er Régiment d'Infanterie, abbreviated 1er RI) is an infantry regiment of the French Army, founded in 1479 as one of the oldest regiments in active service in the world. It is an offspring of the bande de Picardie under the Ancien regime, and one of the five oldest regiments in France. It particularly distinguished itself, as the 1ère Demi-Brigade d'Infanterie de Ligne, during the French Revolutionary Wars at the Battle of Fleurus (1794), the Battle of Messkirch (1800) and the Battle of Biberach (1800). The regiment has been patroned by the city of Saint-Amand-Montrond since 12 April 2003.

The 1er RI is the only French infantry regiment to feature a squadron specialised in urban warfare, the Groupe Commando d'Investigation (CGI, "Investigation Commando Group"). The CGI is, with the Compagnie de Combat en zone Urbaine of the 2nd Foreign Parachute Regiment, the benchmark for urban combat in the French military.

Honours 
The flag bears the names of the battle in which the 1st Infantry Regiment took part for the French Republic: Valmy 1792, Fleurus 1794, Moeskirch 1800, Biberach 1800, Miliana 1842, Guise 1914, Verdun-l'Yser 1916-1917, La Somme 1916, L'Ourcq 1918, Résistance Berry 1944, AFN 1952-1962.

During the Napoleonic Wars the regiment fought at the battles of Caldiero, Wagram, Salamanca, Lützen, Bautzen, Dresden, Leipzig, Montmirail, Vauchamps, Quatre Bras and Waterloo.

The Fourragère of the Médaille militaire was attributed on 10 September 1918, and presented by General Castelneau on 19 October 1918 in Alsace, after the regiment was Mentioned in Despatches at the order of the Army for the fourth time. It is adorned of the olive of the  Croix de Guerre 1914-1918, and of the olive of the Croix de Guerre 1939-1945 for two mentions in despatches awarded during the Phony War and in the French Resistance

References

Infantry regiments of France
Military units and formations established in 1479
1479 establishments in Europe
1470s establishments in France